The Children and Young Persons Act 2008 (c 23) is an Act of the Parliament of the United Kingdom.

Section 44 - Commencement

Orders made under this section
The Children and Young Persons Act 2008 (Commencement No. 1 and Saving Provision) Order 2009 (S.I. 2009/268 (C.11))
The Children and Young Persons Act 2008 (Commencement No.2) Order 2009 (S.I. 2009/3354 (C.154))
The Children and Young Persons Act 2008 (Commencement No.3, Saving and Transitional Provisions) Order 2010 (S.I. 2010/2981 (C.131))
The Children and Young Persons Act 2008 (Commencement No. 1) (England) Order 2009 (S.I. 2009/323 (C.15))
The Children and Young Persons Act 2008 (Commencement No.2) (England) Order 2009 (S.I. 2009/2273 (C.99))
The Children and Young Persons Act 2008 (Commencement No.3) (England) Order 2010 (S.I. 2010/2714 (C.126))
The Children and Young Persons Act 2008 (Commencement No. 1) (Wales) Order 2009 (S.I. 2009/728 (W.64))
The Children and Young Persons Act 2008 (Commencement No. 2) (Wales) Order 2009 (S.I. 2009/1921 (W.175) (C.91))
The Children and Young Persons Act 2008 (Commencement No.3) (Wales) Order 2010 (S.I. 2010/749 (W.77) (C.51))
The Children and Young Persons Act 2008 (Commencement No. 4) (Wales) Order 2010 (S.I. 2010/1329 (W.112) (C.81))
The Children and Young Persons Act 2008 (Commencement No. 5) (Wales) Order 2011 (S.I. 2011/824 (W.123) (C.32))
The Children and Young Persons Act 2008 (Commencement No. 6) (Wales) Order 2011 (S.I. 2011/949 (W.135))

References
Halsbury's Statutes,

External links
The Children and Young Persons Act 2008, as amended from the National Archives.
The Children and Young Persons Act 2008, as originally enacted from the National Archives.
Explanatory notes to the Children and Young Persons Act 2008.

United Kingdom Acts of Parliament 2008
Department for Children, Schools and Families
Children's rights in the United Kingdom
Youth in the United Kingdom
Juvenile law
November 2008 events in the United Kingdom